Trịnh Doanh (4 December 1720 – 15 February 1767) ruled northern Vietnam (Tonkin) from 1740 to 1767 (he ruled with the title Minh Đô Vương). Trịnh Doanh was a third son of Trịnh Cương, and belonged to the line of Trịnh lords who ruled northern Vietnam. His rule was spent putting down rebellions against Trịnh rule.

Trịnh Doanh took over from his brother, Trịnh Giang, who, through financial mismanagement and bad behavior, provoked a wave of revolts against his rule. This was a time of increasing peasant revolts in both the north and the south under the Nguyễn lords. In the north, some of the revolts were apparently led by members of the royal Lê family. The rebellions which broke out in Tonkin during this period, were almost without number. Princes belonging to the royal family, generals, civil mandarins, common people, and out-casts from the hills, all rose in the provinces against the tyranny of the Trịnh, as well as for their personal interests. Chapter 16 (continued) 

Despite the many revolts, Trịnh Doanh defeated them all and passed the rule of Vietnam to his son, Trịnh Sâm.

As far as the Lê dynasty was concerned, there was just one emperor, Lê Hien Tông (1740–1786), who occupied the royal throne in Hanoi.

See also
 Lê dynasty

Sources 
Encyclopedia of Asian History, Volumes 4. 1988. Charles Scribner's Sons, New York.
Annam and its Minor Currency Chapter 16 (downloaded May 2006)

Trịnh lords
1720 births
1767 deaths
18th-century Vietnamese poets